Go Ask Malice: A Slayer's Diary is an original 2006 novel based on the American television series Buffy the Vampire Slayer.  The author, Robert Joseph Levy, also wrote the Buffyverse novel The Suicide King.

The book's title references Go Ask Alice, a controversial book which was an account of drug abuse. In turn, that book's own title is a reference to the 1967 Jefferson Airplane song, "White Rabbit", which includes the lyrics, "Go ask Alice  when she's ten feet tall." Grace Slick wrote the song after noticing possible drug references in Alice in Wonderland.

Plot summary

Faith has always been a loner. Growing up in a broken home in South Boston, shuffled from relative to relative, her only companion was an imaginary friend named Alex, who helped her escape into a fantasy world of monsters and the supernatural, far from the real-life horrors of the waking world.

Now, taken away from her mother by Social Services and shipped off to a foster home, Faith learns that some nightmares are all too real, that the inventions of her childhood really do haunt the night, hungry for blood. Enter Diana Dormer, a Harvard professor and representative of the Watchers' Council who has come to tell Faith of her destiny, to train her, to prepare her for what is to come: Faith is the Chosen One. She alone will stand against the vampires, the demons, and the forces of darkness.

But she's not alone. When Alex, her childhood companion, returns in her dreams, she warns Faith that someone else is coming for her, a force so deadly and unforgiving that it has inspired fear in the underworld for a thousand generations. Its name is Malice.

As memory and fantasy begin to merge, Faith's two worlds collide, with cataclysmic results. A violent battle for the soul of the Slayer is staged, winner take all.

Writing
Robert Joseph Levy said that in this book, he hoped "to explore the choices [Faith] made and the choices that were taken away from her, and to explore what it is to be the Chosen One without a support system of friends or family." He hoped to provide a context for the character's behavior and the way it developed during the third season of Buffy the Vampire Slayer and beyond. "A lot of things about Faith's character are supposed to be assumed by the viewers - a troubled childhood, delinquency and she's a loose girl. I wanted to subvert expectations, and it's one of the reasons I did it as a diary".

Characters

 Faith Lehane - Keeper of the diary.
 Professor Diana Dormer – A professor of folklore and mythology at Harvard University, and Faith's first Watcher.
 Alexandra – Faith has been seeing visions of an apparently imaginary young girl she knows from childhood as 'Alex'.
 Clark Rutherfold (Gable) – Boyfriend of Faith's mother who is heavily involved in crime.
 Faith's mother – A woman who has largely been absent from Faith's life.
 Faith's father – Faith has been told by her mother that her father died when she was young.
 Jess – Friend of Faith during her time with the Joneses and slightly beyond.
 The Jones Family – A Christian family who take Faith under foster care. They had a son, Robert, whom they tell Faith is now dead.
 Kakistos – An ancient vampire so old that his hands are actually cloven hooves. In ancient Greece, he commanded the Maenads, and battled the Slayer Artemia.
 Kenny (Killian) – Drummer of a band called "Freak Wharf." He has the ability to make parts of his imagination come to life. Kenny dates Faith for several months.
 Andra – Girlfriend of Kenny. She was killed by Mister Trick in a cemetery. Using the powers of his mind, Kenny was effectively able to bring her image back as an unusually powerful hallucination.
 Sensei Kanno – A martial artist who trained Potential Slayers and Slayers, including Faith. He was driven by the need to take revenge against vampires who had killed his family.
 Steve – Faith's boyfriend during early 1998.
 Tommy – Faith's best friend during high school. Like Faith, he is a fan of Freak Wharf.
 Vanity Collins (V) – A social worker who regularly met Faith.

Continuity
 It is revealed that Faith's birthday is December 14. Her Watcher, Diana Dormer hints that her Cruciamentum (which takes place on a Slayer's 18th birthday) is approaching in winter 1998; if this were the case and Faith was turning 18 years old on December 14, 1998, then this would make her around one month older than Buffy (who turned 18 years old in January 1999).

Canonical issues

Buffy novels, such as this one are generally not considered by fans as part of canon. They are usually not viewed as official Buffyverse reality, but are novels from the authors' imaginations. However unlike fan fiction, 'overviews' summarizing their story, written early in the writing process, were 'approved' by Fox, who in turn may or may not have sought approval from Whedon (or his office). The book will be published as official Buffy merchandise.

Timing
 Set from December 1997 to June 1998. These months precede Faith's first appearance in the Buffy the Vampire Slayer episode "Faith, Hope & Trick" in autumn 1998.

See also

Faith-related Buffyverse comics and novels
 The Faith Trials (2001)
 The Book of Fours (2001)
 Wisdom of War (2002)
 Haunted (2002)
 Note from the Underground (2002)
 Chaos Bleeds (2003)
 Chosen: The One (2003)
 Queen of the Slayers (2005)
 Dark Congress (2007)
 No Future for You (2007-2008)
 Safe (2009)
 Angel & Faith: Season Nine (2011-2013)
 Angel & Faith: Season Ten (2014-2016)

Footnotes

External links

Book
 Whedonesque.com - Whedonesquers speculate about the book before it is released
 Whedonesque.com - Whedonesquers discuss the book in April 2006
 Simonsays.com - Publisher's webpage for this book

Reviews
 Teen-books.com - Reviews of this book 
 Sci-fi-online.50megs.com - Reviews of this book

Author
 Robertjosephlevy.com - Author's Official Site 

2006 novels
Books based on Buffy the Vampire Slayer
Fictional diaries